Wheels on Fire may refer to:
"This Wheel's on Fire" (song), a song by Bob Dylan and Rick Danko
Wheels on Fire (band), an American rock band
This Wheel's on Fire: Levon Helm and the Story of The Band, the autobiography of musician Levon Helm
"Wheels on Fire," a song by The Magic Numbers from their 2005 album The Magic Numbers
Wheels on Fire, an Amiga game